The sphincter of Oddi (also hepatopancreatic sphincter or Glisson's sphincter), abbreviated as SO, is a muscular valve that in some animals, including humans, controls the flow of digestive juices (bile and pancreatic juice) out of the pancreas through the ampulla of Vater into the second part of the duodenum. It is named after Ruggero Oddi.

Structure 
The sphincter of Oddi is a circular muscle band (Sphincter) that surrounds the major duodenal papilla.

Function 
The sphincter regulates the secretion of pancreatic juice and bile into the duodenum. It also prevents reflux of duodenal contents into the ampulla of Vater. By preventing reflux of the contents of the duodenum, the sphincter of Oddi prevents the accumulation of particulate matter and sludge in the bile ducts, reducing the risk of cholangitis. The sphincter of Oddi also allows retrograde filling of the gallbladder.

The sphincter of Oddi is relaxed by the hormone cholecystokinin via vasoactive intestinal peptide.

Clinical significance

Opiates may cause spasms of the sphincter of Oddi, leading to increased serum amylase levels.

History
The sphincter was described for the first time by Ruggero Oddi when he was a young student in 1887. This description followed extensive research into the physiology of dogs and detailed histological examinations of humans and many other species.

Other animals
In many mammals (including mice, guinea pigs, dogs, and opossums), the smooth muscle around the ampulla of Vater does not form a sphincter.

References

Further reading
 
 

Digestive system
Gallbladder